Route 53 is a highway in southeastern Missouri.  Its southern terminus is at Route 25 in Holcomb.  Its northern terminus is at Business U.S. Route 67 Business in Poplar Bluff.

Route 53 is one of the original state highways and has remained essentially unchanged since 1922.

Major intersections

References

053
Transportation in Butler County, Missouri
Transportation in Dunklin County, Missouri